David N. Stamos (born 1957) is a Canadian philosopher of science and professor in the Philosophy Department at York University.  He studied in York University, where he received his Ph.D. in Philosophy. He emphasizes an interdisciplinary approach for philosophy. His two main mottoes are: "It is not wisdom to ignore evidence" and "Politics does not determine good scholarship."

Research interests
 Philosophy of biology
 Darwin (historical research on his species concept and pre-Darwinian taxonomy) 
 David Hume (finding Hume's God).
 Human nature
 Human rights
 Scientific Imagination
 Karl Popper
 Albert Einstein
 Edgar Allan Poe

Selected books
 Edgar Allan Poe, Eureka, and Scientific Imagination. Paradigm Publishers. 2017. 
 The Myth of Universal Human Rights: Its Origin, History, and Explanation, Along with a More Humane Way. SUNY Press. 2013. 
Evolution and the Big Questions: Sex, Race, Religion, and Other Matters. Wiley-Blackwell. 2008. 
 Recipient of a Choice 2008 Outstanding Academic Title Award, translated into Spanish and Portuguese, forthcoming in Arabic.
Darwin and the Nature of Species. State University of New York Press. 2007. 
The Species Problem: Biological Species, Ontology, and the Metaphysics of Biology. Lexington Books. 2004.

References

External links
York University, Department of Philosophy
YFile - A provocative new book examines life's big questions in relation to evolution
David Stamos: Evolution and Evidence; Liberal Arts & Professional Studies, York University - (Video)
Dr David N. Stamos - The Myth of Universal Human Rights - (Video) at cohumanists.ca
David Stamos: The Modern Myth of Human Rights Part 1 - (Video) at Centre for Inquiry Canada
David Stamos at Academia.edu

Living people
Canadian non-fiction writers
Canadian people of Greek descent
Academic staff of York University
Philosophers of science
Canadian philosophers
York University alumni
1957 births